Pia Olsen Dyhr (born 30 November 1971 in Vallensbæk, Copenhagen) is a Danish politician who has been a member of the Folketing for the Socialist People's Party since the 2007 general elections. Dyhr has served as Minister for Trade and Investment and later Minister of Transport in the first Helle Thorning-Schmidt Cabinet. Following her party's resignation from the cabinet, Dyhr was elected as chairman for the Socialist People's Party.

Background 
Dyhr graduated from Ishøj Gymnasium in 1985. She studied at the College of Europe from 1992 to 1993 and received an MA in European studies. In 1994, she graduated from the University of Copenhagen with a degree in political science.

Political career
Dyhr was first represented in the Folketing from 28 November 2006 to 15 December 2006, acting as a temporary substitute member for Poul Henrik Hedeboe. She was first elected directly into parliament in the 2007 general election. She was reelected in the 2011 with 2,461 votes, in 2015 with 9,575 votes and in 2019 with 20,047 votes.

In 2014 she was elected chairman of the Socialist People's Party, succeeding Annette Vilhelmsen.

References

External links
 

1971 births
Living people
Socialist People's Party (Denmark) politicians
Government ministers of Denmark
Women government ministers of Denmark
People from Vallensbæk Municipality
21st-century Danish women politicians
Women members of the Folketing
Members of the Folketing 2007–2011
Members of the Folketing 2011–2015
Members of the Folketing 2015–2019
Members of the Folketing 2019–2022
Leaders of the Socialist People's Party (Denmark)
Transport ministers of Denmark
Members of the Folketing 2022–2026